Dharamvir Yadav was MLA from Haryana Vikas Party from Salhawas (Vidhan Sabha constituency) in 1996 Haryana Legislative Assembly election. He died in 2016.

References 

Haryana MLAs 1996–2000
Year of birth missing
2016 deaths